667.. The Neighbour of the Beast is the debut album by the modern glam metal group Wig Wam. Released in Norway on 8 March 2004 the album would establish Wig Wam as one of Norway's biggest rock acts, resulting in their participation in the 2005 Eurovision Song Contest.

The album would include two Wig Wam singles, being the Melanie C cover "I Turn to You" and the anthemic "Hard to Be a Rock'n Roller". Several other popular tracks, including their Melodi Grand Prix 2004 song "Crazy Things" (which would be released in promo form), were also included on the album.

In January 2005, the album was renamed to Hard to Be a Rock'n Roller. A radio-edit from the song "Hard to Be a Rock'n Roller" and a few videos were added. In March from the same year, this album was renamed another time to "Hard to Be a Rock n' Roller... In Kiev!". The song "In my dreams" and the video "Hard to Be a Rock n' Roller" were added to the original track list from the album at that time.

The name of the album 667.. The Neighbour of the Beast is a quote from a computer game named Max Payne 2 as well as a twist on the Iron Maiden album The Number of the Beast. 667 also turns up as the license plate of the "guitar car" on their third album Non Stop Rock'n Roll.

Track listing
"667" - 0:49
"The Best Song in the World" - 3:10
"Crazy Things" - 3:09
"Out of Time" - 4:05
"Mine All Mine" - 3:38
"Hard to Be a Rock'n Roller" - 4:35
"Tell Me Where to Go" - 4:09
"Erection" - 2:09
"I Turn to You" - 4:09
"Car-Lyle" - 3:53
"Bless the Night" - 3:50
"A Long Way" - 4:22
"No More Living on Lies" - 3:54

Wig Wam albums
2004 debut albums